Joseph Sto. Niño "JB" Blando Bernos is a Filipino politician. He is the incumbent mayor of La Paz, Abra since 2022. He served as a member of the Philippine House of Representatives representing the Lone District of Abra for three consecutive terms from 2016 to 2022.

Political career

House of Representatives (2019–2022) 
On March 24, 2021, Bernos announced that he had tested positive for COVID-19.

Mayor of La Paz, Abra (2022-present) 
Bernos won unopposed in the 2022 Philippine general election for mayor in La Paz, Abra.

References 

Living people
Members of the House of Representatives of the Philippines from Abra (province)
PDP–Laban politicians
Liberal Party (Philippines) politicians
People from Abra (province)
1978 births